The Smith Family is an American comedy-drama television series starring Henry Fonda and Ron Howard and produced by Don Fedderson Productions. The series aired on ABC from January 20, 1971, to June 7, 1972, for 39 episodes.

Synopsis
Chad Smith is a police detective in Los Angeles. The show covered the exploits of Sergeant Smith and his relationships with his wife Betty and their three children: 18-year-old Cindy, 15-year-old Bob and 7-year-old Brian.

The opening season theme song was an adapted version of "Primrose Lane", composed by Red Callender (as George Callender) and Wayne Shanklin.

Cast
Henry Fonda as Detective Sergeant Chad Smith, the father of the Smith family
Janet Blair as Betty Smith, Chad's wife
Darleen Carr as Cindy Smith, the daughter
John Carter as Sgt. Ray Martin
Ron Howard as Bob Smith, the elder son
Vince Howard as Sgt. Ed Thomas
Richard O'Brien as Captain O'Farrell
Michael-James Wixted as Brian Smith, the younger son

Episodes

Season 1: 1971

Season 2: 1971–72

References

Further reading
 Kleiner, Dick (NEA). "Henry Fonda Turns to TV". The Fort Scott Tribune. August 11, 1970.
 Browning, Norma Lee. "Fonda Has No Worries About Series". The Chicago Tribune. January 17, 1971.
 Buck, Jerry. "Penguins More Like Real People Than Smith Family". The Free Lance-Star. January 21, 1971.
 Laurent, Lawrence. "'Smith Family' Gives Fonda Money, Time". The Washington Post. June 25, 1971.
 Peterson, Clarence. "On the Air: Henry Fonda's Working Hard, Clubbing His 'Family' into Line". The Chicago Tribune. July 12, 1971.
 "C.B.S. and A.B.C. Overhaul Schedules". The New York Times. November 17, 1971.
 Browning, Norma Lee. "Hollywood: Back to the Movies". The Bangor Daily News. November 26, 1971.

External links

Contrasting opening credits for first and second seasons at YouTube

1971 American television series debuts
1972 American television series endings
American Broadcasting Company original programming
1970s American comedy-drama television series
Fictional portrayals of the Los Angeles Police Department
Television series by CBS Studios
Television shows set in Los Angeles